Enteromius anniae is a species of ray-finned fish in the genus Enteromius. It has only been recorded from the River Koumba, a tributary of the Tominé/Corubal River in Guinea and Guinea-Bissau.

References 

Enteromius
Taxa named by Christian Lévêque
Fish described in 1983